Shankar P. Sharma, is a senior Economist and Diplomat who is currently serving as the Ambassador of Nepal to India. He was the Ambassador of Nepal to the United States from 2009-2014.  Dr. Sharma served as the Vice-Chairman of the National Planning Commission from 2002 to 2006. He has a Ph.D. in economics from the University of Hawaii. 

Dr. Sharma also worked as a consultant to the Constitution Committee on "Distribution of Natural Resources, Economic Rights and Public Revenue" in helping to draft the new Constitution of Nepal.
He has also served in various other capacities for the Government of Nepal such as the member of NPC, Chief Advisor in Ministry of Finance and Alternate Governor of Nepal for the International Monetary Fund and Senior Economist in Institute of South East Asian Studies (1986–1993).

Dr. Sharma has extensive experience in government, international institutions, and economic research. Before joining the National Planning Commission as a member in 1997, he worked as a Senior Economic Advisor, Ministry of Finance, Nepal; a Senior Economist in the Institute of Southeast Asian Studies, Singapore; and a Fellow in the East-West Center, Hawaii. He also served as a Professor of Economics in the Centre for Economic Development and Administration, Tribhuvan University.

As a highest level development planner in Nepal, Dr. Sharma provided leadership for national planning, policy guidance, program development and monitoring. He initiated and introduced the Poverty Reduction Strategy Paper- Nepal and Medium-term Expenditure Framework in Nepal and facilitated inter-agency collaboration for the economic and human development of the country, while working in the Planning Commission.

In his long and distinguished career with the Government of Nepal, spanning over more than a decade, Dr. Sharma had extensive dealings with senior levels of donor governments, development agencies, NGOs and the corporate sector in policy dialogue, foreign aid, peace building, and development of the country.

At the regional and global level, Dr. Sharma was engaged as a member with the World Energy Council Committee for Energy Issues of Developing Countries, London and the advisory panel on MDG Assessment of the Asia Pacific Region, UNESCAP, Bangkok. He contributed towards an assessment of Asian Least Developed Countries in the context of Brussels LDCs’ Plan of Action and a report on Global Financial Crisis and Its Implications to Fiscal policy in the Asia-Pacific Region for UNESCAP, Bangkok. He had hands-on experience at the field level, as an international consultant in Laos, Bhutan, and India. He also worked as a consultant expert in a number of national and international agencies including the Asian Development Bank, the World Bank, and United Nations Development Programme. Dr. Sharma was also an editor to ASEAN Economic Bulletin and a consultant editor to Hydrocarbon Asia, both published from Singapore for about seven years.

Dr. Sharma has published eight books (edited or authored) and more than fifty articles on the economy, energy, and the environment of the Asia-Pacific region including Nepal. Some of his contributions include Economic Reforms in Nepal and Prospects for Improving Nepal-US Trade and Investment Relationship (Nepal USA Chamber of Commerce and Industry, Nepal), A Generic Guideline for Development through Economic Diplomacy (Institute of Foreign Affairs, Nepal), Trade, Protectionism, and Industrial Adjustment in Vegetable Oils: Asian Response to North America (Institute of Southeast Asian Studies, Singapore), and Energy Market and Policies in ASEAN (Institute of Southeast Asian Studies, Singapore,).

Interviews taken with him have appeared in the international newspapers and magazine including, Asia Week, International Herald Tribune, Straits Times, Business Times(Singapore and Malaysia), New Straits Times, Bangkok Post, Forbes, Japan Times, Los Angeles Times and almost all newspapers and magazines published from Nepal.

He is also the Immediate Past President of the East-West Center Association, Nepal. He is married to Kalpana Sharma and has a son (Sarin Ghimire) and a daughter (Silpa Sharma).

References

 
 

Nepalese economists
Nepalese diplomats
Year of birth missing (living people)
Ambassadors of Nepal to the United States
Living people